|}
{| class="collapsible collapsed" cellpadding="0" cellspacing="0" style="clear:right; float:right; text-align:center; font-weight:bold;" width="280px"
! colspan="3" style="border:1px solid black; background-color: #77DD77;" | Also Ran

The 1996 Epsom Derby was a horse race which took place at Epsom Downs on Saturday 8 June 1996. It was the 217th running of the Derby, and it was won by Shaamit. The winner was ridden by Michael Hills and trained by William Haggas. The pre-race favourite Dushyantor finished second.

Race details
 Sponsor: Vodafone
 Winner's prize money: £523,100
 Going: Good (Good to Firm in places)
 Number of runners: 20
 Winner's time: 2m 35.05s

Full result

* The distances between the horses are shown in lengths or shorter. shd = short-head; hd = head; nk = neck.† Trainers are based in Great Britain unless indicated.

Winner's details
Further details of the winner, Shaamit:

 Foaled: 11 February 1993, in Ireland
 Sire: Mtoto; Dam: Shomoose (Habitat)
 Owner: Khalifa Dasmal
 Breeder: Khalifa Dasmal
 Rating in 1996 International Classifications: 124

Form analysis

Two-year-old races
Notable runs by the future Derby participants as two-year-olds in 1995.

 Glory of Dancer – 1st Gran Criterium
 Alhaarth – 1st Vintage Stakes, 1st Solario Stakes, 1st Champagne Stakes, 1st Dewhurst Stakes
 Jack Jennings – 6th Washington Singer Stakes, 3rd Royal Lodge Stakes
 Acharne – 6th Royal Lodge Stakes
 Even Top – 1st Somerville Tattersall Stakes, 2nd Racing Post Trophy
 Storm Trooper – 2nd Autumn Stakes
 Zaforum – 4th Zetland Stakes, 8th Prix Isonomy
 Busy Flight – 2nd Haynes, Hanson and Clark Stakes, 2nd Horris Hill Stakes
 Prince of My Heart – 6th Silver Tankard Stakes

The road to Epsom
Early-season appearances in 1996 and trial races prior to running in the Derby.
 Dushyantor – 2nd Dante Stakes
 Glory of Dancer – 2nd Sandown Classic Trial, 1st Dante Stakes
 Alhaarth – 2nd Craven Stakes, 4th 2,000 Guineas
 Mystic Knight – 1st Lingfield Derby Trial
 Jack Jennings – 3rd Feilden Stakes, 3rd Dante Stakes
 Acharne – 5th Premio Parioli, 6th Lingfield Derby Trial
 Double Leaf – 4th Sandown Classic Trial, 5th Dante Stakes
 Classic Eagle – 7th Thirsk Classic Trial, 6th Chester Vase
 Tasdid – 3rd Leopardstown 2,000 Guineas Trial Stakes, 4th Amethyst Stakes
 Even Top – 2nd 2,000 Guineas
 Storm Trooper – 1st Feilden Stakes, 11th 2,000 Guineas, 6th Dante Stakes
 Zaforum – 3rd Lingfield Derby Trial
 St Mawes – 2nd Feilden Stakes, 2nd Chester Vase, 3rd Predominate Stakes
 Busy Flight – 6th Sandown Classic Trial
 Prince of My Heart – 3rd Chester Vase
 Portuguese Lil – 10th 1,000 Guineas

Subsequent Group 1 wins
Group 1 / Grade I victories after running in the Derby.

 Shantou – St. Leger (1996), Gran Premio del Jockey Club (1996), Gran Premio di Milano (1997)
 Chief Contender – Prix du Cadran (1997)
 Storm Trooper – Hollywood Invitational Turf Handicap (1998)

Subsequent breeding careers
Leading progeny of participants in the 1996 Epsom Derby.

Sires of Classic winners
Alhaarth (5th)
 Haafhd - 1st 2000 Guineas Stakes (2004)
 Phoenix Reach - 1st Hong Kong Vase (2004)
 Bandari - 3rd St Leger Stakes (2002)
 Iktitaf - 1st Morgiana Hurdle (2006)
Shaamit (1st)
 Bollin Eric - 1st St Leger Stakes (2002)

Sires of Group/Grade One winners
Even Top (13th)
 Cirrus des Aigles - Champion Older Horse (2011)

Sires of National Hunt horses
Shantou (3rd)
 The Storyteller - 1st Champion Novice Chase (2018)
 Ballynagour - 1st Prix la Barka (2015)
 Beware The Bear - 1st Festival Trophy Handicap Chase (2019)
 Bun Doran - 1st Desert Orchid Chase (2019)
Dushyantor (2nd) - also shuttled to Chile
 Loosen My Load - 1st Sharp Novices' Hurdle (2009)
 Shop Dj - 2nd Champion Novice Chase (2012)
Busy Flight (18th)
 Mister Quasimodo - 3rd Desert Orchid Chase (2007)
 Impulsive Star - 1st Classic Chase (2019)

Other Stallions
Glory Of Dancer (4th) - Minor flat winners - Exported to IndiaStorm Trooper (15th) - Exported to India

Broodmare
Portuguese Lil (20th) - Sole runner tailed off in bumper only start

References

External links
 Colour Chart – Derby 1996

Epsom Derby
 1996
Epsom Derby
Epsom Derby
20th century in Surrey